Neoparasitus is a genus of mites in the family Pachylaelapidae. There are at least four described species in Neoparasitus.

Species
These four species belong to the genus Neoparasitus:
 Neoparasitus jacobsonianus (Berlese, 1911)
 Neoparasitus molossus (Berlese, 1923)
 Neoparasitus orientalis (Berlese, 1910)
 Neoparasitus quartus (Vitzthum, 1926)

References

Pachylaelapidae
Articles created by Qbugbot